Raimo Pihl (born 28 October 1949) is a Swedish athlete. He competed in the men's decathlon at the 1976 Summer Olympics. Born in Suodenniemi, Finland, Pihl moved to Sweden with his parents when he was three years old.

References

1949 births
Living people
Athletes (track and field) at the 1976 Summer Olympics
Swedish decathletes
Olympic athletes of Sweden
People from Sastamala
Finnish emigrants to Sweden
Swedish people of Finnish descent